George "Tubby" Dixon (January 4, 1896 – August 4, 1940) was a Negro leagues catcher  for several years before the founding of the first Negro National League, and in its first few seasons.

When he started catching for the Chicago American Giants during 1917 spring training in Palm Beach, Florida, newspaper reports called him "the best young player that has been tried out with the Giants in years."

In 1917, 21 year-old Dixon registered for the WWI Draft. He lists his current occupation as professional ball player, working for Rube Foster. He lists his current address as 3664 Wabash Avenue in Chicago, Illinois. And he lists himself as single but supporting his mother.

Dixon appears to have played his last few seasons in Cleveland. He died in Cleveland in 1940.

References

External links
 and Baseball-Reference Black Baseball stats and Seamheads

Negro league baseball managers
Birmingham Black Barons players
Chicago American Giants players
Cleveland Cubs players
Cleveland Hornets players
Cleveland Tigers (baseball) players
Cleveland Red Sox players
Indianapolis ABCs players
1896 births
1940 deaths
People from Greenwood, South Carolina
20th-century African-American sportspeople
Baseball players from Cleveland